Captain Hilliard Brooke Bell  (9 March 1897 – 16 September 1960) was a Canadian First World War flying ace credited with ten aerial victories while serving in the British Royal Flying Corps and Royal Air Force.

Early life and education
Hilliard Brooke Bell was born to Edwin and Sarah R. Bell (née Brooke) in Chatham, Ontario, but later the family moved to Toronto. Bell was educated at St. Andrew's College, Aurora, where he joined the College Officer Training Corps. He then attended University College, Toronto, where he became a member of the Alpha Delta Phi Fraternity. Hilliard gave up his studies to join the 67th (University of Toronto) Battery Depot, Canadian Field Artillery, at Kingston on 23 May 1916.

World War I
Bell initially served as a gunner, until commissioned as a lieutenant in November. He then waited for a posting to a battery for five months, before eventually requesting a transfer to the Royal Flying Corps. He began his training in early 1917 at Camp Borden, and following instruction in aeroplane construction, began flight training, and flew solo. On 23 July Bell was appointed a second lieutenant on probation in the Royal Flying Corps, and sailed from Montreal to England in August, where he received advanced flying training with No. 81 Squadron RFC at Scampton, initially on the Avro 504, then the Bristol M.1c. He was confirmed in his rank, and appointed a flying officer, on 4 September.

With only six hours of solo flying in the M.1c, Bell was sent to France on 16 October, travelling to Saint-Omer by train, where he joined No. 66 Squadron RFC. His first flight in France was on 18 October in a Sopwith Pup to familiarize himself with the aircraft and the location. Over the next month No. 66 Squadron were re-equipped with the Sopwith Camel. In November No. 66 Squadron was one of six RFC squadrons sent to Italy, to reinforce the Italian Front after the disaster at Caporetto. Their aircraft were dismantled, crated, and loaded onto flat cars. The squadron's personnel also travelled by train to Milan, where they were quartered at the best hotel in the city for a week, until the weather cleared and they could make the 1½ hour flight to Verona, finally arriving at their base at Grossa on 4 December.

Bell gained his first aerial victory on 16 December 1917 by driving down an Albatros D.V out of control. Further victories followed on 4 February 1918, by shooting an Albatros D.III down in flames, and he destroyed an Aviatik two-seater on 6 February. On 23 February, even though he was still only a second lieutenant, he was appointed a flight commander with the temporary rank of captain. He drove down a Berg fighter on 16 March, and on 19 March destroyed another Albatros D.III, for his fifth victory, making him an ace. He accounted for two more D.III's destroyed on 23 April and 3 May. On 8 May he was awarded the Military Cross, which was gazetted on 16 September. His citation read:
Temporary Captain Hilliard Brooke Bell, RAF.
"For conspicuous gallantry and devotion to duty. He destroyed five enemy machines, and drove down one out of control. He is a very fine patrol leader and an excellent officer. His work is thoroughly good, all round."

He went on to gain three more victories over enemy fighters on 10 May, and 1 and 4 July, before being posted back to England to serve as an instructor. On 2 November 1918, he was awarded the Bronze Medal of Military Valor "in recognition of distinguished services rendered" by the Italian government. He was transferred to the RAF's unemployed list on 5 April 1919.

List of aerial victories

Post-war career
Bell returned to his law studies in Toronto, graduating from Osgoode Hall and being called to the Bar of Ontario in 1921. He was appointed King's Counsel in 1935, and practised as a lawyer until his death in hospital in Toronto on 16 September 1960.

His War Experiences were published posthumously in the Journal of the Canadian Aviation Historical Society in 1963–64.

Footnotes

References

1897 births
1960 deaths
People from Chatham-Kent
Royal Regiment of Canadian Artillery personnel
Royal Flying Corps officers
Royal Air Force personnel of World War I
Canadian World War I flying aces
Recipients of the Military Cross
Recipients of the Bronze Medal of Military Valor
Osgoode Hall Law School alumni
20th-century Canadian lawyers
Canadian King's Counsel
Canadian recipients of the Military Cross
Canadian military personnel of World War I